Ezra T. Phelps Farm Complex is a historic home and farm complex located at Marion in Wayne County, New York.  The property includes the farmhouse, a timber framed barn, and brick smokehouse.  The farmhouse was built prior to 1843 and is a front gabled Greek Revival structure with side and back wings.

It was listed on the National Register of Historic Places in 1997.

References

Houses on the National Register of Historic Places in New York (state)
Houses completed in 1843
Houses in Wayne County, New York
1843 establishments in New York (state)
National Register of Historic Places in Wayne County, New York